Ak Bolak is a village in Afghanistan, located at the east end of the Lataband Pass. It was described in the early years of the 20th century as being a thriving place, and as having a number of salt mines in the vicinity.

References

Populated places in Takhar Province
Villages in Afghanistan